Želimir Terkeš (born 8 January 1981) is a Bosnian-Herzegovinian retired football striker who last played for Zadar. He previously played for NK Zadar, NK Zagreb, HNK Čapljina, HŠK Zrinjski Mostar, NK Inter Zaprešić, Chongqing Lifan and Perak FA.

Club career
Terkeš started his career in the youth ranks of his hometown club HNK Čapljina before moving the youth ranks of the Croatian club NK Zagreb. Unable to win a place in the first team, he returned to his home country, and after playing a year and a half for Zrinjski Mostar and featuring in the Bosnia and Herzegovina U-21 team, he secured a transfer back to Prva HNL, signing for NK Inter Zaprešić. Unable to get into a scoring form, he moved in the summer of 2004 to NK Zadar, but was relegated at the end of the season. Impressing in the Druga HNL, he helped his club get back to the top flight after two seasons. The 2007–2008 season was his most impressive by far. He was the top scorer of the league in the end with 21 goals, three goals ahead of the Rijeka's Radomir Đalović and four ahead of the Hajduk Split player Nikola Kalinić, also accumulating 7 assists, having a run of ten goals and three assists in six games (rounds 24–29) as well. He remained in Zadar, however, but after having surgery, he struggled to regain his previous form. Somewhat plagued by injuries, he scored 14 goals in 66 games in the next two and a half seasons. In March 2011, he secured a transfer to the China League One side Chongqing Lifan and in his last match for NK Zadar before that, a 1–0 home win against NK Lokomotiva, he scored the winning goal. He signed for Malaysia Super League side Perak FA in December 2013 after a successful trial.

On 28 February 2014, Terkeš joined Indonesia Super League team Persija Jakarta for one season contract.

International career
His games secured him interest from foreign clubs and got him a call-up for the Bosnia and Herzegovina national football team, for which he made his debut on 1 June 2008 in the 1–0 friendly win against Azerbaijan. It remained his sole international appearance.

References

External links
Želimir Terkeš pikat Yob

1981 births
Living people
People from Čapljina
Croats of Bosnia and Herzegovina
Association football forwards
Bosnia and Herzegovina footballers
Bosnia and Herzegovina international footballers
NK Zagreb players
HNK Čapljina players
HŠK Zrinjski Mostar players
NK Inter Zaprešić players
NK Zadar players
Chongqing Liangjiang Athletic F.C. players
Perak F.C. players
Persija Jakarta players
Croatian Football League players
First Football League (Croatia) players
China League One players
Malaysia Super League players
Liga 1 (Indonesia) players
Second Football League (Croatia) players
Bosnia and Herzegovina expatriate footballers
Expatriate footballers in Croatia
Bosnia and Herzegovina expatriate sportspeople in Croatia
Expatriate footballers in China
Bosnia and Herzegovina expatriate sportspeople in China
Expatriate footballers in Malaysia
Bosnia and Herzegovina expatriate sportspeople in Malaysia
Expatriate footballers in Indonesia